Amar Sakhri was the minister of education for Algeria in the 1995 government of Mokdad Sifi.

References

Living people
Year of birth missing (living people)
Education ministers of Algeria
Place of birth missing (living people)
20th-century Algerian politicians